Xingshan railway station is a railway station, located on the Zhengzhou–Wanzhou high-speed railway in Beidouping village, Gufu town, Xingshan County, Yichang, Hubei Province, China.

History
The station opened with the Zhengzhou–Wanzhou high-speed railway in June 2022.

Future Development
The following lines are also expected to serve this station:
Yichang–Xingshan high-speed railway (under construction, due to open in 2025, runs from Yichang East to Xingshan)

References

Railway stations in Hubei
Railway stations in China opened in 2022